Levenslied (Dutch, literally "life song" or "song about life") is a sentimental Dutch-language subgenre of popular music. Levenslied lyrics can be sweet or bitter, light and sentimental, but also reflective and dark, about subjects such as love, misery and far-away, sunny, exotic holiday places. The darker, more sentimental songs are also known as "smartlap" (literally: "grief cloth"). The levenslied is related to the chanson though for a lower-class audience, like the schlager.

A typical levenslied has catchy, simple rhythms and melodies and is built up in couplets and refrains. Traditional musical instruments in levenslied music are the accordion and the barrel organ. Modern levenslied artists also use synthesizers and guitars.

The songs are usually in Dutch but also English or Italian.

Two cities in the Netherlands, Tilburg and Nijmegen, have annual Levenslied festivals.

Artists
Notable Dutch levenslied singers:
Willy Alberti
Willeke Alberti
Frans Bauer
Peter Blanker
Renée de Haan
André Hazes
Stef Bos
Johnny Jordaan
Pierre Kartner
Tante Leen
Imca Marina
Manke Nelis
Dries Roelvink
Sieneke
Jan Smit
Zangeres Zonder Naam

Notable Flemish levenslied singers:

Eddy Wally
Laura Lynn
Will Tura

References

 
Contemporary music
Dutch styles of music